HMS Dasher (D37) was a British Royal Navy aircraft carrier, of the , converted merchant vessels, and one of the shortest-lived escort carriers. She served in the Second World War and sank on 27 March 1943.

Design and description
The Avenger-class escort carriers were converted U.S. Maritime Commission (USMC) type C3 American merchant ships. Their design was based on the United States Navys  (AVG1). To differentiate between the two classes, the Royal Navy ships were prefixed with a 'B' (BAVG).

HMS Dasher (BAVG4) was built by the Sun Shipbuilding and Drydock Company, Chester, Pennsylvania. The ship was originally named Rio de Janeiro, intended for passenger/cargo service with Moore-McCormack Lines, laid down as yard hull 189, USMC hull 62 on 14 March 1940, launched on 11 April 1941. She was converted to an escort aircraft carrier in the Tietjen & Lang shipyards New Jersey and commissioned into the Royal Navy on 2 July 1942.

Aircraft could be housed in the  half hangar below the flight deck. Armament comprised three single-mounted 4-inch dual-purpose guns, two forward and one aft, and fifteen 20 mm cannon on single or twin mounts. She had the capacity for 15 aircraft which could be a mixture of Grumman Martlet or Hawker Sea Hurricane fighters and Fairey Swordfish torpedo bombers.

Service history

The ship was transferred to the Royal Navy and commissioned into RN service as HMS Dasher (D37) on 2 July 1942. She participated in Operation Torch, with her sister ship , carrying Sea Hurricanes of 804 Naval Air Squadron. She escorted one convoy successfully, but shortly after leaving with the second, Dasher suffered engine trouble and turned back. Shortly after getting to the Firth of Clyde on 27 March 1943, she suffered a major internal explosion and sank.

Loss

Various possible causes have been suggested, including one of her aircraft crashing onto the flight deck and igniting petrol fumes from leaking tanks. Much of what happened remains unknown.  The death toll, 379 out of 528 crewmen, despite rapid response and assistance from ships and rescue craft from Brodick and Lamlash on the Isle of Arran and from Ardrossan and Greenock on the Scottish mainland, was amongst the highest in British home waters. Many escaped from the ship but died of hypothermia or of burns suffered when escaped fuel ignited on the water. Most of the dead were buried at Ardrossan or Greenock.

The British blamed the bad design of the stowage and handling, while the US blamed the disaster on poor RN petrol-handling procedures.

The government of the time, eager to avoid damage to morale and anxious to avoid any suggestion of faulty US construction, tried to cover up the sinking. The local media were ordered to make no reference to the tragedy. There were rumours that the authorities ordered the dead to be buried in an unmarked mass grave, but none had been found , and the Royal Navy said that a mass unmarked grave would have been against Admiralty policy and that all sources relating to the sinking of HMS Dasher are in the public domain. A witness said in 2021 that survivors had told her that there was a mortuary where they were taken to identify about fifty bodies laid out, "just dumped". People living nearby saw the bodies over a high wall, "then they all disappeared".

Furious relatives protested and some of the dead were returned to their families for burial. The survivors were ordered not to talk about what happened. This policy subsequently attracted much criticism. There was a short announcement of the sinking in The Times in 1945, then nothing more was said officially for 70 years. There are now memorials to those lost at both Ardrossan and Brodick. The wreck site lies approximately halfway on the Caledonian MacBrayne ferry route between Ardrossan and Brodick and is a controlled site under the Protection of Military Remains Act.

Teak boards from the flight deck of Dasher washed up on the beach at Ardrossan in 1999. They were riddled with tubes made by burrowing teredo worms. A section of this wood featured in the "Flotsam and Jetsam" exhibition in the Millennium Dome and another piece is held by the North Ayrshire Heritage Centre in Saltcoats.

There has been speculation that one corpse from the sinking was used during the British deception Operation Mincemeat ("The Man Who Never Was"). The case is argued by authors John and Noreen Steele in their 2002 book The Secrets of HMS "Dasher”'’ - however, this theory was disproved in 2010.An archaeological dig was undertaken in October 2012 to ascertain whether there was a mass grave within Ardrossan Cemetery containing bodies from Dasher''. No evidence was found that the ground in the area searched had been disturbed.

References

Sources

Further reading

External links

 Article of The Shetland Times on the cause of the explosion
 Ardrossan CWGC Cemetery record
 Greenock CWGC Cemetery record
 Chatham CWGC Cemetery record
 Uboat.net
 www.wrecksite.eu

 

1941 ships
Ships built by the Sun Shipbuilding & Drydock Company
Ships built in Chester, Pennsylvania
World War II aircraft carriers of the United Kingdom
Avenger-class escort carriers
Maritime incidents in March 1943
1943 disasters in the United Kingdom
World War II shipwrecks in the Atlantic Ocean
Shipwrecks in the Firth of Clyde
Protected Wrecks of Scotland
Ships sunk by non-combat internal explosions
Aircraft carrier fires
Explosions in 1943
History of North Ayrshire
History of Inverclyde
Explosions in Scotland
1943 in Scotland